Lydell Douglas Mitchell (born May 30, 1949) is an American former professional football player who was a running back in the National Football League (NFL) with the Baltimore Colts, San Diego Chargers and Los Angeles Rams from 1972 to 1980.

Football
Mitchell played high school football at Salem High School in New Jersey. He was taken in the second round of the 1972 NFL Draft out of Penn State University by the Colts (48th overall). Mitchell was a teammate of Hall of Fame running back Franco Harris of the Pittsburgh Steelers while at Penn State, and many actually thought the Steelers were going to draft Mitchell instead of Harris before the draft. He was inducted into the College Football Hall of Fame in 2004.

Mitchell established himself in the mid-1970s as one of the best all-around running backs in the NFL. Mitchell, along with teammate Bert Jones, propelled the Baltimore Colts to three consecutive AFC East Division titles, unseating a powerhouse Miami Dolphins team that had topped the division for four straight years (1971–74).

Mitchell topped the 1,000-yard rushing plateau in three consecutive seasons (1975–77) earning Pro Bowl honors each year. In addition to his rushing exploits, he twice led the NFL in pass receptions, in 1974 and 1977. Mitchell was named 2nd Team All-Pro in 1976 and 1977 as well as being named 2nd Team All-AFC following the 1975 campaign.

Mitchell was traded from the Colts to the Chargers for Joe Washington and a 1979 fifth-round selection (131st overall–traded to Detroit Lions for Greg Landry) on August 23, 1978. The transaction was the result of Mitchell's acrimonious contract dispute with Colts management in which he accused team owner Robert Irsay of bad faith bargaining and racial discrimination. Mitchell turned in a solid season in 1978 with the Dan Fouts-led Chargers and finished his career in 1980 appearing in two games with the Los Angeles Rams.

Personal life
Mitchell earned a Bachelor of Science in secondary education from Penn State University in 1972.  He lives in Baltimore, where he and his Nittany Lion teammate Franco Harris owned Super Bakery, a company that produces nutrition-oriented foods for schoolchildren. He and Harris also partnered to rescue the Parks Sausage Company in Baltimore, the first African-American owned business in the U.S. to go public. Mitchell is also active in lecturing students on the dangers of  drug and alcohol abuse. Mitchell is a member of the Omega Psi Phi fraternity.

See also
 List of NCAA major college football yearly scoring leaders

References

External links
 Super Bakery, Inc.

1949 births
Living people
American businesspeople
American football running backs
Baltimore Colts players
Los Angeles Rams players
Penn State Nittany Lions football players
San Diego Chargers players
American Conference Pro Bowl players
College Football Hall of Fame inductees
People from Salem, New Jersey
Players of American football from New Jersey
African-American players of American football
Salem High School (New Jersey) alumni
21st-century African-American people
20th-century African-American sportspeople